Tigert may refer to:

People with the surname
John James Tigert III (1856-1906), American Methodist Bishop
John James Tigert IV (1882–1965), American academic administrator
Frank Tigert and Jesse Tigert, two men from Estill Springs, Tennessee shot by Jim McIlherron, leading to his lynching in 1918

Location
Tigert Hall, building in Florida